H. V. Eastman Lake (commonly known as Eastman Lake) is an artificial lake in the Sierra Nevada foothills of Madera County, California. A small percentage of the northwest area of the reservoir is in Mariposa County. The lake was named in honor of Judge H. V. Eastman (1891-1972) who had served as Secretary Manager of the Chowchilla Water District.

The lake formed in 1975 from the construction of Buchanan Dam across the Chowchilla River as a flood control and irrigation project of the United States Army Corps of Engineers. The earthen dam, 218 feet high with a length of 1746 feet at the crest, impounding a maximum capacity of 150,000 acre-feet of Chowchilla River water in the reservoir, is owned and operated by the Corps.

See also
 List of dams and reservoirs in California
 List of lakes in California

References

 Yosemite / Buchanan Dam and Eastman Lake Madera County Film Commission

External links
 U.S. Army Corps of Engineers - Eastman Lake

External links
 

Reservoirs in Madera County, California
Reservoirs in Mariposa County, California
San Joaquin River
Reservoirs in California
Reservoirs in Northern California